The 1988 Commonwealth Final was the fifth running of the Commonwealth Final as part of the qualification for the 1988 Speedway World Championship. The 1988 Final was run on 12 June at the Norfolk Arena in King's Lynn, England, and was part of the World Championship qualifying for riders from the Commonwealth nations.

Riders qualified for the Final from the Australian, British and New Zealand Championships.

1988 Commonwealth Final
12 June
 King's Lynn, Norfolk Arena
Qualification: Top 11 plus 1 reserve to the Overseas Final in Coventry, England

References

See also
 Motorcycle Speedway

1988
World Individual
1988 in British motorsport
1988 in English sport